Quadratur des Kreises (German for "Squaring the circle") is the debut album by German hip hop group Freundeskreis. It hit #12 in Germany, #34 in Switzerland and #38 in Austria. Three singles were released from the album, the first one being the hit "A-N-N-A", which peaked at #6 in the German charts and reached the top 30 in Austria and Switzerland.

Track listing

Singles

Certifications

External links
 Freundeskreis website

1997 albums
Freundeskreis albums